Kim Bo-mi (born 11 October 1998) is a South Korean sport shooter.

She participated at the 2018 ISSF World Shooting Championships, winning a medal.

References

External links

Living people
1998 births
South Korean female sport shooters
ISSF pistol shooters
Shooters at the 2020 Summer Olympics
Olympic shooters of South Korea